"Lost" is a song recorded by Australian singer-songwriter Vassy, featuring Dutch collaborators Afrojack and Oliver Rosa. The track became Vassy's fourth number one single, the second for Afrojack, and the first for Rosa, in the United States on Billboard's Dance Club Songs chart, reaching the summit in its May 5, 2018 issue.

Track listings
Digital download
"Lost" – 2:49

Digital download (Remixes)
"Lost" (Kue Mix)
"Lost" (Kue Chill Mix)
"Lost" (Ray Rhodes Mix)
"Lost" (Ray Rhodes Radio Mix)
"Lost" (AmPm Mix)
"Lost" (Dan Thomas Progressive House Mix)
"Lost" (Lodato Mix)
"Lost" (Lodato Radio Mix)
"Lost" (Lodato Instrumental Mix)

Charts

Weekly charts

Year-end charts

References

External links
Official Video at YouTube

2017 songs
2017 singles
2018 singles
Songs written by Vassy (singer)
Vassy (singer) songs